IL-2 Sturmovik: Birds of Prey, or Wings of Prey on Windows, is a combat flight simulation video game. As with previous installments of the series IL-2 Sturmovik, it depicts combat aircraft from World War II, although with less focus on realistic simulation than other entries in the series. The game has a campaign mode in which players are able to fly the Allies against the Axis, and also a multiplayer mode in which they are able to select either faction. A demo of the game launched on the PSN and Xbox 360's Xbox Live on 29 July 2009.

Birds of Prey is based around the large-scale aerial combat and ground military operations of World War II. Players can participate in some of the war's most famous battles, piloting fighters, attack aircraft and heavy bombers across a range of missions. There are six theatres of war to engage in: Battle of Britain, Stalingrad, Berlin, Sicily, Korsun and the Battle of the Bulge, representing the main airborne battles of World War II in Europe.

Birds of Prey has a new damage effects engine. Players can see real-time damage to the aircraft such as holes in the wings and trail lines during dog fights. IL-2 Sturmovik: Birds of Prey features hundreds of aircraft taking part in air battles. The environmental engine also produces high-detail, realistic landscapes that allow players to easily see ground support actions.

The game was developed by Gaijin Entertainment, who subsequently developed Birds of Steel, also exclusively for consoles. Birds of Steel shares many traits with Birds of Prey (including HUD, aircraft models, controls, and menu design) but differentiates itself by concentrating primarily on US–Japanese aerial battles of the Pacific theater.

Reception

On the release, home console and Windows versions were met with positive reception, while versions for portable consoles received mixed to negative critical reception. GameRankings and Metacritic gave it 80.71% and 80 out of 100 for the Xbox 360 version; 79.82% and 81 out of 100 for the PlayStation 3 version; 79.55% and 78 out of 100 for the Windows version; 60% and 63 out of 100 for the PSP version; and 42.25% and 41 out of 100 for the DS version.

References

External links

Gaijin Entertainment homepage

2009 video games
1C Company games
Nintendo DS games
PlayStation 3 games
PlayStation Portable games
Video games scored by Jeremy Soule
Video games developed in Russia
Video games set in the United Kingdom
Video games set in England
Windows games
World War II flight simulation video games
Xbox 360 games
Video games set in the Soviet Union
Multiplayer and single-player video games
Iceberg Interactive games
505 Games games
Gaijin Entertainment games